Suicide is considered a serious issue in Singapore. The issues have been rising in recent years, with the rate of suicide increasing for all demographics. It is the leading cause of death for those aged between 10 and 29 years old. Males account for the most suicides at over 66.6% of all suicides. 

Like most issues of mental illness and death, suicide is generally viewed as a taboo subject in Singapore. This may hinder efforts to reduce suicide rates. Some argue that changing public opinion on clinical depression and similar mental disorders may be a huge step in improving the rate of suicides.

Singapore ranked 105th by age-standardised suicide rate according to the World Health Organization in 2016. Generally, the rate of suicide is rising, in 2016 it was 8.54, up from 8.43 in 2015.

Legality
Suicide was decriminalised in Singapore with the passing of the Criminal Law Reform Bill on 6 May 2019.

Before that, Section 309 of the Penal Code stated that "Whoever attempts to commit suicide, and does any act towards the commission of such offence, shall be punished with imprisonment for a term which may extend to one year, or with fine, or with both." The section was rarely enforced, between 2013 and 2015, only 0.6% of reported cases was brought to court.

It is still illegal to abet or assist another person in suicide. Section 306 of the Penal Code states that "If any person commits suicide, whoever abets the commission of such suicide shall be punished with imprisonment for a term which may extend to 10 years, and shall also be liable to fine." Section 305, also relates to the abetting of suicide, however it is specifically if the suicide victim is less than 18 years old, intoxicated or mentally ill. It states that "If any person under 18 years of age, any insane person, any delirious person, any idiot, or any person in a state of intoxication, commits suicide, whoever abets the commission of such suicide shall be punished with death or imprisonment for life, or with imprisonment for a term not exceeding 10 years, and shall also be liable to fine."

On 9 September 2018, the Penal Code review committee called for the law on attempted suicide to be repealed. On 6 May 2019, the law was officially amended to decriminalise suicide.

Preventive measures

There are numerous preventive policies with the intention of reducing suicide. The Samaritans of Singapore (SOS) is a non denominational, non-profit suicide prevention centre. SOS is a member of the National Council of Social Service and is also affiliated to the American Association of Suicidology (AAS), International Association for Suicide Prevention, Befrienders Worldwide, and International Federation of Telephonic Emergency Services (IFOTES). The organisation provides multiple services such as a 24-hour suicide hotline, professional counselling and crisis support.

Another measure is outlawing the abetment of suicide.

Notable cases

A notable case is the slayers suicide pact, also known as the Sheng Long Fu suicides or Singapore teen suicide pact. The suicide pact, which took place on 23 August 2008, had nine teenagers agreeing to it.  On the day of the suicide, one backed out, two died by suicide and the rest backing down after seeing the first suicides. This case shook the island and many were appalled by the incident. Peer pressure and a lack of maturity were blamed for the incident.

This case revealed brought media attention to teenage suicides in Singapore and how peer pressure can be used to manipulate the young.

Criticism
Critics blame Singapore for having high stress levels which lead to a higher amount of suicide. There is also much criticism towards the way Singapore deals with suicide victims and survivors. For example, critics point out the fact that suicide survivors should receive treatment instead of getting punished. They also argue that someone in the state of mind where they consider suicide as an option, likely would not think of legal repercussion as a strong deterrent.

See also
Suicide

References

Singaporean culture
Society of Singapore 	
Mental health in Singapore
Singapore